Three Village Historical Society is a historical society headquartered in East Setauket, New York, that preserves the history of the villages of Old Field, Poquott, the Setaukets, and Stony Brook. The society educates visitors about local history through events, walking tours, and educational programs.

The society had great success with an exhibition about the area's Culper Spy Ring during the American Revolution. The television show Turn: Washington's Spies led to major interest among the public with attendance more than doubling since the AMC show’s debut.

In 2016, the society presented an exhibition about Chicken Hill, a historic mixed-race enclave that was destroyed by urban development in the 1960s. Currently, there is a movement to save another historic mixed-race community: Bethel-Christian Avenue-Laurel Hill Historical District.

Notes

External links
 

Historical societies in New York (state)
Brookhaven, New York
Year of establishment missing